Computational Statistics is a quarterly peer-reviewed scientific journal that publishes applications and research in the field of computational statistics, as well as reviews of hardware, software, and books. According to the Journal Citation Reports, the journal has a 2012 impact factor of 0.482. It was established in 1986 as Computational Statistics Quarterly and obtained its current title in 1992. The journal is published by Springer Science+Business Media and the editor-in-chief is Yuichi Mori (Okayama University of Science).

See also 
List of statistics journals

References

External links 
 

Computational statistics journals
Quarterly journals
English-language journals